Scopula sjostedti is a moth of the family Geometridae. It is found in China.

References

Moths described in 1936
sjostedti
Moths of Asia